Luch Design Bureau, located in Kyiv, Ukraine, is a major Ukrainian developer of components for the defense industry.

The company is in close co-operation with the Artem holding company, also located in Kyiv. Artem is the main manufacturer of the models developed by the Luch Design Bureau.

The company was first established in Ukraine in 1965 and quickly became a leading Soviet developer of automated control systems and diagnostics systems in aviation engineering.

History 
1965 – development and release for production of PPP-3SM mobile position of preliminary preparation for application (with its location on UAZ car chassis) with air-to-air missiles manual control and PPP-3SAM mobile position of preliminary preparation for application with missiles automatic control system as a basis for creation of further missile automatic control systems for the Air and Navy Forces.

1965-1969 – creation and release for production of SAK-46 automatic control system for control of air missiles and automatic control and AKIPS-80 test mobile station for control of anti-submarine missiles. In the Soviet Union the mentioned developments were recognized as a first automatic control systems by the State Commissions.

1968-1972 – development and release for production of “Ingul” system (with its location on GAZ-66 car chassis) for preparation for application and maintenance of 9 types of air missiles.

1968-1977 – development and release for production of automatic test and control mobile stations:

- AKIPS-125 for underwater missiles control; 

- AKIPS-4U for  anti-submarine missiles control; 

- AKIPS-4U1 for torpedoes control.

1969-1977 – development and release for production of “Trubezh” system for preparation for application and maintenance of 12 types of air missiles.

1975-1977 – creation of current information aircraft recorder - RIU.

1977-1980 – development and release for production of “Ingul-A” and “Trubezh-A” systems with use of modularity (container) equipment construction for preparation for application and control of 26 types of missiles and guided air bombs (“Ingul-A”) and 18 types of missiles (“Trubezh-A”).

1978-1989 – development and release for production of automatic control and test mobile stations AKIPS-1 and AKIPS-3.2 for control of air anti-submarine missiles.

All mentioned stations were put into service by the Armed Forces of the Soviet Union and a number of foreign countries.

1981-1983 – development and release for production of multipurpose modular “Gurt” system which provides the preparation for application of more than 40 types of missiles and their various modifications. The “Gurt” system replaced “Ingul” and “Trubezh” systems that were in service.

In addition to new equipment samples development SKDB “Luch” is actively engaged in modernization and overhaul-period renewal of existing equipment.

By the respective coordinated decisions of the ministries of Ukraine the SKDB “Luch” was assigned as a Principal enterprise of Ukraine that conducts and coordinate works on specified life cycle and  lifetime prolongation of air, anti-aircraft missiles, mine and torpedo weapon, the “Ingul” and “Gurt” systems as well as AKIPS stations.

Since 1979 SKDB “Luch” has been developing and producing units of servo electric control surface actuators of control systems of air, anti-aircraft missiles and torpedoes. More than ten steering modules with electric actuators were developed for products of various classes which according to their characteristics are highly competitive with the best world analogs.

Thus, for example, in 1986 the block of servo electric control surface actuators for R-77 air-to-air missile with lattice control surfaces was created. On the basis of the compact commutatorless electric motors created in Ukraine for the previous decade the SKDB “Luch” developed and has been producing a number of small-sized units of servo electric control surface actuators for the guided tank missiles. Actuators are a part of developed and produced by the SKDB “Luch” digital control systems which provide rounds and missiles precise guidance. Actuators provide high accuracy characteristics, have increased jamming resistance and withstand overloads which take place during firing from guns. 

Since 2002 the SKDB “Luch” has been supplying (instead of the “Gurt” system) the “Gurt-M” system which provides:

- control and preparation for application of more than 50 various modifications of air missiles and guided air bombs;

- final checking of missiles at manufacturing plants;

- fault diagnostic during missiles repair;

- missiles technical state forecast during overhaul-period renewal.

More recently the SKDB “Luch” has been a Principal enterprise that develops conceptually new special military equipment for Ukraine with participation of over than 30 Ukrainian enterprises. Products developed under this program are included in the top-priority category.

Products
 
 
List of products 
 Various types of anti-tank guided missiles (ATGM), anti-tank weapons systems, multiple rocket launchers (MLRS), air-launched weapons and naval guided weapon systems. 
 Flight control systems, electric steering gear blocks and other components for guided precision weaponry 
 Automatic control systems and systems for guided precision weaponry diagnostics
 Modernization of aviation weapons control systems
 Lifetime prolongation and restoration of guided precision weapons
 Telemetric systems for guided ammunition tests
 Optical electronic systems for tank and artillery guns, barrel bending angle measurement

Examples
 
 Neptune anti ship cruise missile
 Dnipro SAM (joint venture with Ukroboronservice)
 Skif or Stuhna-P ATGM
 RK-3 Corsar ATGM
 Barrier ATGM
 Alta helicopter launched ATGM
 Vilkha MLRS

See also
 List of design bureaus in Ukraine

References

External links
 Company home page

Defence companies of Ukraine
Science and technology in Ukraine
Companies based in Kyiv
Defence companies of the Soviet Union
Science and technology in the Soviet Union
Design companies established in 1965
1965 establishments in the Soviet Union
1965 establishments in Ukraine
Design bureaus
Ukroboronprom